Kong Ludvigøyane is a small group of islands south of southwestern Edgeøya. The group includes Russebuholmane, Arendtsøya, Berentine Island, and Bruhnsøya. They form part of Thousand Islands. They are named after King Ludwig II (1845–86) of Bavaria, Germany. The islands may be the Hopeless Iles of the Muscovy Company's map (1625).

References

 Norwegian Polar Institute Place Names of Svalbard Database
Purchas, S. 1625. Hakluytus Posthumus or Purchas His Pilgrimes: Contayning a History of the World in Sea Voyages and Lande Travells by Englishmen and others. Volumes XIII and XIV (Reprint 1906 J. Maclehose and sons).

Islands of Svalbard